Hermann Park Golf Course is a golf course in Houston's Hermann Park, in the U.S. state of Texas. The course was renovated in 1999.

References

External links
 
 
 Hermann Park Golf Course at the City of Houston, Texas

Golf clubs and courses in Texas
Hermann Park
Golf in Houston